The Beishan Old Western-style House is a historical house in Jinsha Township, Kinmen County, Taiwan.

History
Construction of the house began around 1918 or 1919 for the Wang family and was completed in 1932. The house was seized by the Imperial Japanese Army in 1937 and returned  to the family in 1946. In 1954, the house was taken by the Republic of China Army. From 1956 to 1965, it was used as a storage depot for engineering materials. In 2015, the house was declared a historical building. On 29 September 2021, restoration work on the house began in a ceremony attended by Magistrate Yang Cheng-wu and descendants of the original owners. The restoration work was expected to cost around NT$40 million.

Architecture
The house was constructed with Western and  Hokkien architectural elements. Its exterior walls feature relief sculptures and the front of the house features totems.

See also
 List of tourist attractions in Taiwan

References

1932 establishments in China
Buildings and structures in Kinmen County
Houses completed in 1932
Houses in Taiwan
Jinsha Township
Tourist attractions in Kinmen County